Athar Minallah (born 30 December 1961) is a Pakistani jurist serving as a judge of Supreme Court of Pakistan since 11 November 2022. Prior to that, he served as the 5th Chief Justice of Islamabad High Court from 28 November 2018 to 10 November 2022.

Before becoming a judge, he was a lawyer by profession and played an active part in the Lawyers' Movement which was backed by former Prime Minister Nawaz Sharif.

Early life and career 
Minallah obtained his early education from his hometown, Haripur. He joined Pakistan Customs after completing his higher education, rising to senior positions. However, he later resigned and started practicing law.

Following the sacking of former Chief Justice of Pakistan Iftikhar Muhammad Chaudhry, he joined the Lawyers' Movement for the restoration of the judiciary.

However, after Justice Chaudhry’s restoration, he became a critic of the judiciary because of excessive suo motu cases which led to the pendency of routine cases.

Appointment to Islamabad High Court 
Justice Minallah was appointed as an IHC judge in June 2014 and is considered to be one of the finest judges in the superior judiciary . During his tenure, he authored landmark judgments in matters related to civil litigation including real estate, criminal cases, the environment and missing persons .

He was third on the seniority list in the Islamabad High Court till the sacking of Justice Shaukat Aziz Siddiqui, the former senior puisne judge who was removed on the recommendation of Supreme Judicial Council that found him guilty of misconduct over claims of manipulation of judicial proceedings against the Inter-Services Intelligence, Pakistan's premier intelligence agency. Subsequently, Justice Minallah became the senior puisne judge.

He became the 5th Chief Justice of Islamabad High Court on 28 November 2018, following the retirement of Muhammad Anwar Khan Kasi.

Elevation to Supreme Court of Pakistan 
The elevation of Athar Minallah from the Islamabad High Court to the Supreme Court was approved by the Judicial Commission of Pakistan (JCP) on 24 October 2022. He took oath on 11 November 2022, along with Justice Shahid Waheed and Justice Syed Hasan Azhar Rizvi. Justice Aamer Farooq succeeded him as the 6th Chief Justice of Islamabad High Court.

Personal life 
Justice Minallah is the eldest son of Nasrum Minallah, who served as a Commissioner during the 1960s and 70s, and Bilquis Nasrum Minallah, Member of the National Assembly of Pakistan form 1985 to 1988.

He is the son-in-law of Justice Ghulam Safdar Shah, who was part of the bench that convicted and sentenced former prime minister Zulfikar Ali Bhutto but wrote a dissenting note against the conviction, for which he faced the wrath of the-then military dictator, General Zia ul Haq.

References 

Pakistani lawyers
Hindkowan people
1961 births
Living people
Chief Justices of the Islamabad High Court
Justices of the Supreme Court of Pakistan